São Francisco Xavier is a village and an administrative district in the municipality of São José dos Campos, São Paulo State, Brazil.

São José dos Campos
Neighbourhoods in São Paulo (state)